The Guiren Living Art Center is an art center in Gueiren District, Tainan, Taiwan.

History
The art center building was originally constructed in 1934 as the village office for Kijin Village of Tainan Prefecture. After the handover of Taiwan from Japan to the Republic of China in 1945, the building was used as the Guiren Police Precinct under Tainan County Police Bureau. After the police station had been relocated, the building was left idle for a while. Later on, it was renovated into a living art center named Guiren Living Art Center.

Architecture
The center is housed in a yellow-colored building. The former detention rooms from the previous police station were left intact and have been integrated into the building overall layout. It consists of exhibition rooms, reading areas and computer room.

Exhibitions
The center displays various exhibitions and a collection of books.

Activities
The center has also become the venue for yoga and aerobic classes.

See also
 List of tourist attractions in Taiwan

References

1934 establishments in Taiwan
Art centers in Tainan
Former police stations in Taiwan